RNS may be an initialism for:

Rabid Neurosis, a music piracy organisation
 RNS formalism in the string theory of physics
Reactive nitrogen species
Regulatory News Service 
Religion News Service
 Rennes - Saint-Jacques Airport, France, IATA code
Residue numeral system in mathematics
Responsive neurostimulation device, an epilepsy treatment
"R.N.S.", a song by Slaughterhouse from Southpaw: Music from and Inspired By the Motion Picture